Felix Zwayer (born 19 May 1981) is a German football referee who is based in Berlin. He referees for SC Charlottenburg of the Berlin Football Association. He is a FIFA referee, and is ranked as a UEFA elite category referee.

Refereeing career
Zwayer began officiating on the DFB level in 2004. In 2007, he was promoted to officiate in the 2. Bundesliga, as well as an assistant referee in the Bundesliga. Two years later, Zwayer was promoted to officiate in the Bundesliga for the 2009–10 season. 

In 2005, Zwayer was involved in the match fixing scandal which centered around 2. Bundesliga referee Robert Hoyzer, who took bribes to fix several matches which he officiated. Zwayer assisted him in a match and accepted a bribe of 300 euros to avoid critical scenes for Wuppertaler SV. In January 2005, he and three other high-ranking referees informed the DFB about Hoyzer's match fixing. He was subsequently banned from refereeing for 6 months, a suspension that was kept secret for several years until the German newspaper Die Zeit published a secret file from the German FA. 

On 21 February 2016, Bayer Leverkusen manager Roger Schmidt was sent off by Zwayer in a match against Borussia Dortmund after disputing a free kick that led to a goal for Dortmund, the only goal of the game. Schmidt initially refused to leave, causing the referee to suspend the game and lead the players off the field, causing an eight-minute delay, before the game resumed without Schmidt on the field.

On 30 April 2018, Zwayer was selected by FIFA as one of the video assistant referees for the 2018 FIFA World Cup in Russia, the first FIFA World Cup to use the technology.

Personal life
Zwayer is a real estate broker and lives in Berlin.

See also
List of football referees

References

External links

 Profile at dfb.de 
 Profile at worldfootball.net

1981 births
Living people
German football referees
Sportspeople from Berlin
UEFA Champions League referees
UEFA Europa League referees
2018 FIFA World Cup referees